Łąkorz  is a village in the administrative district of Gmina Biskupiec, within Nowe Miasto County, Warmian-Masurian Voivodeship, in northern Poland.

The village has a population of 900.

References

Villages in Nowe Miasto County